Megliadino San Fidenzio was a comune (municipality) in the Province of Padua in the Italian region of Veneto, located about  southwest of Venice and about  southwest of Padua.

Megliadino San Fidenzio bordered the following former and current municipalities: Casale di Scodosia, Megliadino San Vitale, Montagnana, Saletto (former), Santa Margherita d'Adige (former).

It is named for the legendary bishop Saint Fidentius of Padua.

Since 17 February 2018 Megliadino San Fidenzio is part of Borgo Veneto municipality.

References

External links
 Official website

Cities and towns in Veneto